Bradley Klahn and Michael Venus were the defending champions, however Venus chose not to participate. Klahn partnered with Matt Reid and won the title, defeating Marcus Daniell and Artem Sitak in the final, 4–6, 6–4, [10–7].

Seeds

Draw

References

 Main Draw

Keio Challenger - Doubles
Keio Challenger
2014 Keio Challenger